Bob Dean (December 17, 1929 – May 10, 2007) was a kicker and two-way lineman with the Edmonton Eskimos of the Canadian Football League.

Dean played college football at the University of Maryland, where he lettered from 1948 to 1950. He graduated with a BA degree in education. He enjoyed three highly successful years with the Eskimos dynasty. He played in three Grey Cup games, from 1954 to 1956, against the Montreal Alouettes, winning all of them. His convert on Jackie Parker's famous 90 yard fumble return won the 42nd Grey Cup classic.

Dean retired from playing after the 1956 season (though he did play one game for the Montreal Alouettes in 1957) but made Edmonton his home and continued to coach. He was a teacher at Victoria Composite where he coached of City Senior Football Champions in 1966 and 1967. At Bonnie Doon Composite, where he was assistant principal, they won two City Senior Football titles (1971 and 1972 City and Provincial Champion) with Dean as Defensive Coordinator of the Lancers. (Ken Brice was Head Coach). Later he was principal at Victoria and at M.E. Lazerte Composite High School where he coached his teams to four more City Senior Football championships.

He later served on the Edmonton Police Commission and the Edmonton Public School Board.

Further reading
Obituary, CFL.

1929 births
2007 deaths
Edmonton Elks players
Montreal Alouettes players
Maryland Terrapins football players
Players of Canadian football from Pittsburgh